Brian Backhouse (7 May 1948 – 13 September 2003) was an Australian rules footballer who played with North Melbourne in the Victorian Football League (VFL).

Backhouse, a rover, was recruited from Colac Imperials. He made six league appearances for North Melbourne, all in the 1968 VFL season. At the end of the year he was delisted by North Melbourne and later played at Waverley.

References

1948 births
Australian rules footballers from Victoria (Australia)
North Melbourne Football Club players
Waverley Football Club players
2003 deaths
Manuka Football Club players